Glen River is a short river in County Down, Northern Ireland. The  course flows north-east from the foot of Slieve Commedagh and Slieve Donard in the Mourne Mountains into Dundrum Bay at Newcastle, descending .

It is quite a fast-flowing river with many small waterfalls and deep pools. The bedrock is composed of granite in the upper parts, becoming dark shale lower down. It flows through Donard Forest and Donard Park and is crossed by five bridges. The path that runs alongside the river is commonly used by walkers climbing Slieve Donard.

There is an unusually prominent ice house beside the river, just before it enters the forest. It was built by the third earl of Annseley in the 1830s to serve his Donard lodge residence.

References

Rivers of County Down
Newcastle, County Down